Piccadilly is a major street in London, England.

Piccadilly may also refer to:

Arts and entertainment 
Cinemas and theatres
Piccadilly Cinema, Birmingham, in Sparkhill, Birmingham, England
Piccadilly Cinema, Adelaide, in North Adelaide, South Australia
Piccadilly Theatre, in London's West End
Piccadilly Theatre (Beirut), a former theatre in Lebanon
Music
Piccadilly, subsidiary of Pye Records, a British record label
Le Piccadilly, a 1904 musical composition by Erik Satie
Other
Piccadilly (film), a British silent drama film made in 1929
Piccadilly, a novel written in 1870 by Laurence Oliphant (1829–1888)
Piccadilly Radio, former name of Greatest Hits Radio Manchester & The North West, a commercial radio station in Manchester, England

Commerce 
Piccadilly (supermarket chain), a defunct Bulgarian supermarket chain
Piccadilly Restaurants, an American cafeteria-style restaurant chain
Piccadilly Press, an imprint of a British publishing house owned by Bonnier Zaffre

Places 
Australia
Piccadilly, South Australia, a small town in the Adelaide Hills
Piccadilly, Western Australia, a suburb of Kalgoorlie

Canada
Piccadilly, a community in Central Frontenac, Ontario
 Piccadilly, a village in the local service district of Piccadilly Slant-Abraham's Cove, Newfoundland and Labrador

England
Piccadilly, Manchester, a street in Manchester city centre
Piccadilly Gardens, a green space on Piccadilly, Manchester
Piccadilly (ward), an electoral ward of Manchester
Piccadilly, Warwickshire, a small hamlet
Piccadilly (York), a street in York

Transport 
Piccadilly line, part of London Underground railway system, London, England
Piccadilly Circus tube station a station on this line
Manchester Piccadilly station, the principal railway station in Manchester, England

See also 
Manchester Piccadilly Gardens bus station, a bus station in Manchester, England
Peccadillo (disambiguation)
Piccadill, a collar of cut-work lace popular in the late-16th to early-17th centuries
Piccadilly Circus, a road junction and public space in London's West End
Piccadilly Gardens (painting), a 1954 painting by L. S. Lowry
Piccadilly Gardens tram stop, a tram stop in Manchester, England